Leman Bozkurt Altınçekiç (1932–2001) was the first female accredited jet pilot in Turkish Air Force and NATO.

Early years
Leman Bozkurt was born in 1932 in Sarıkamış, Kars Province. After graduating from the girls' highschool in İstanbul,  she applied to İnönü Training Center of Turkish Aeronautical Association in İnönü ilçe (district) of Eskişehir Province to be trained as a glider pilot.

Military service
When Turkish Air Force decided to enroll women in 1954, she applied to Air Forces. She was the very first female student in the military school in İzmir.  She was trained on propeller aircraft between 1955 and 1957. In an interview she says that in the early days, the school had no boarding facility for the female students and she had to stay as a guest in the house of an officer's family. On 30 August 1957, she graduated as a military pilot. Although, later, five other female students were also accepted to school, she was the only female student to join the aviation unit in Eskişehir military base. She was trained in Eskişehir as a jet pilot and earned the rank of second lieutenant on 22 November 1958. Up to 1967 she flew in Republic F-84 Thunderjet and Lockheed T-33. Later years she served in staff duty. She retired as a senior air colonel.

Private life
In 1959, Leman Bozkurt married Tahir Altınçekiç, a colleague in Eskişehir. She died on 4 May 2001 in İzmir. She was laid to rest in Karabağlar Cemetery.

Legacy
On 1 December 1984, which is the 50th anniversary of full suffrage for Turkish women, she was invited to the Turkish parliament for receiving a plaque for being the first woman in a profession.

References

1932 births
2001 deaths
Turkish women aviators
Glider pilots
People from Sarıkamış
Turkish Air Force officers
Women in the Turkish military